Turo is an American peer-to-peer carsharing company based in San Francisco, United States. The company allows private car owners to rent out their vehicles via an online and mobile interface in over 56 countries.

In July 2019, the American holding company IAC invested $250 million in Turo, a deal that valued the company at more than $1 billion.

As of 2020, the website has 14 million members and 450,000 vehicles listed operating in over 56 countries.

On January 1, 2021, the Wall Street Journal reported that Turo CEO Andre Haddad planned to take the company public in 2021, either through a traditional IPO or some alternative method. The company is expected be listed on the New York Stock Exchange under the ticker symbol TURO based on their initial S-1 filing.

History 

RelayRides was launched in Boston in June 2010. The peer-to-peer car-sharing concept was inspired by similar online marketplaces such as Airbnb and eBay. In late 2010, the company expanded to San Francisco, where it is now headquartered. In 2012, it launched nationwide in the U.S.

Initially, renting a car through RelayRides required installing an in-car device that enabled GPS monitoring, remote unlocking, and smart card entry, similar to Zipcar. In 2012, Turo partnered with major automaker General Motors and their OnStar division with the goal of enabling renters to unlock GM cars with their mobile phones without installing additional technology. In 2013, however, RelayRides discontinued both its in-car device and its Onstar technology integration in favor of in-person key exchange.

Between 2010 and 2014, RelayRides received $52.5 million in funding from Canaan Partners, August Capital, Google Ventures, Shasta Ventures, and Trinity Ventures.

In November 2015, RelayRides changed its name to Turo in order, the company said, to reflect the company's shift away from short-term to long-term rentals. Forbes included it among 14 "hottest on-demand startups" in 2015, with a valuation of $311 million.

In June 2018, Turo announced plans to offer a new in-car device allowing GPS monitoring and remote unlocking through the Turo app.

In 2016 and 2017, Turo launched in three Canadian provinces: Alberta, Ontario, and Quebec. Also in 2016, Turo launched in the United Kingdom.

In July 2019, InterActiveCorp (IAC) invested $250 million in venture capital funding. The investment made IAC Turo's largest shareholder.

As of 2021, there have been over 350,000 vehicles listed on Turo, operating in over 56 countries.

While Turo has a good neighbor policy in place, the company has been accused of being a bad neighbor as the app can crowd out street parking in busy urban areas.

Forbidding car owners from listing their cars on other platforms 

In 2019, Turo updated their terms of service to prevent hosts from sharing their car on any other car-sharing services. Turo declared that "failure to abide by this condition may result in fines, penalties, denial of a physical damage claim, removal of the vehicle from the Services, account closure, or other action, in Turo’s sole discretion." The change was formally implemented on July 15, 2019. Avoiding claims that this could be "failure to deal" or reduction in competition, they stated that their service "tends" to perform badly when dealing with other companies' booking software.

Unlicensed insurance activity in the state of New York

In May 2013, the New York State Department of Financial Services issued a consumer alert, warning that RelayRides misrepresented insurance coverage for users of its program. New York issued a cease-and-desist letter ordering RelayRides to stop operations, and RelayRides suspended operations in the state. RelayRides was fined $200,000 for false advertising for engaging in unlicensed insurance activity, and other violations.

Services 

Unlike traditional car-rental services, Turo does not own or maintain any cars. The company offers a platform on which car owners can rent their cars. Turo claims that its rental costs are lower compared to traditional car rental services.

People who wish to rent their cars can register their cars online to be rented by other Turo members. The car owner states when and where the car will be available. A Turo member who wants to rent a car reserves a specific time slot for the car online. Turo takes 10 to 40 percent of rental income, depending on the insurance coverage it provides the car owner.

Turo does not require renters to have personal coverage if the renter books a trip with a protection plan provided by Turo. Turo provides up to $750,000 in third party liability insurance from Travelers Insurance in the United States, up to $2 million in Canada, and up to £20 million in the UK, with 5 plans varying in vehicle protection.

On June 28, 2022, a California Appellate Court found that Turo is not a car rental company at all. Their reasoning was that Turo is merely an online platform that helps car owners find people to rent from them. This will have two legal effects: first, the protections afforded to car rental companies will not be extended to Turo, second, services like Uber and Lyft will try to leverage this case so that they are no longer deemed to be a transportation company.

See also

Alternatives to car use
Car rental
Car sharing
Carpooling
Getaround, competing peer-to-peer carsharing service in US and Europe
Momo Car-Sharing, European carsharing demonstration project
, company that formerly offered a similar service in the UK

References

External links
 

Transport companies established in 2010
Carsharing
Peer-to-peer
Online marketplaces of the United States
American companies established in 2010
2010 establishments in Massachusetts
Companies based in Boston